The SIGINT conference was a three-day conference held yearly on the social and technical aspects of digital society between 2009 and 2013. It was organized by the Chaos Computer Club and held in Cologne, Germany. The conference featured both lectures and workshops on various different topics. It specifically wanted to focus on the social and political aspect of technology and hacker culture. The conference was officially discontinued in January 2014.

See also 
 Chaos Communication Congress
 Chaos Communication Camp

References

External links 
 Archived version of the conference website
 Video recordings are available from the majority of talks: SIGINT13, SIGINT12, SIGINT10, SIGINT09

Free-software events
Computer security conferences